The Democratic Party of Turkmenistan  (TDP) has been the ruling party of Turkmenistan since 1991.

The party was led by former Soviet provincial party leader Saparmyrat Nyýazow from the dissolution of the Soviet Union in the early 1990s until his death in 2006. In 2013, President Gurbanguly Berdimuhamedow suspended his party membership for the duration of his presidency. The current leader is Ata Serdarow. Their rule is described as authoritarian.

History
The DPT was created following the dissolution of the Soviet Union as a successor party to the Communist Party of Turkmenistan. The internal structure of the old party was effectively unchanged in the transition, as was the old guard. The DPT has faced limited and sporadic challenges from alternative political parties in the past but have never faced a significant challenge during an election because of the often repressive nature of politics in the country.  Opposition parties are usually crushed before they make any significant grounds in public opinion.  This has been the case even after the formal legalisation of opposition parties in 2010.

Chairmen

Policies
Due to the lack of opposition parties to contest for government, the DPT controls most, if not all, industries of significant revenue directly. Central planning is a key element of party policy and serves as the basis of functionality for government services. The party's ideology of "Turkmen nationalism" was theorised by former party leader Saparmyrat Nyýazow for the purpose of an authoritarian state ideology in Turkmenistan.

Election results

Turkmenistan elects on the national level a head of state - the president - and a legislature. Elections in Turkmenistan have been widely criticised for being completely fraudulent and attempting to give an appearance of legitimacy to what is in reality a dictatorship.

Presidential elections 
The last presidential election was held in 2022.

Legislative elections
The Assembly is a 125-member legislative body officially led by the president of Turkmenistan. The DPT, not unlike every other facet of political life in Turkmenistan, holds a majority of seats, with accusations that the "multi-party system" established in the early 2010s only consists of parties loyal to the DPT. The last election for the assembly was held in 2018.

See also
Elections in Turkmenistan
People's Council of Turkmenistan
Assembly of Turkmenistan
Politics of Turkmenistan

References

Sources
Country Studies accessed on 31 July 2008
Badykova, Najia (2004-06-18). "The Turkmen Economy: Challenges and Opportunities". St Antony's College, University of Oxford. Retrieved 31 July 2008.
BBC: Turkmenistan's 'sham poll' closes. Sunday, 19 December 2004, 17:22 GMT

External links 
 

Political parties in Turkmenistan
Parties of one-party systems
Nationalist parties in Asia
Political parties established in 1991
1991 establishments in Turkmenistan